This is a list of Albanian football transfers in the summer transfer window 2010 by club.

Superliga

Dinamo Tirana

In:

Out:

Besa Kavajë

In:

Out:

KF Tirana

In:

Out:

References

External links
 Footballdatabase.eu

Albania
Trans
2009-2010